Robert Cross or Crosse may refer to:
Robert Cross (footballer) (1914–?), Scottish footballer
Robert Cross (mayor), former mayor of Victoria, British Columbia
Robert Craigie Cross (1911–2000), professor of logic at Aberdeen University
Robert Thomas Cross (1850–1923), British astrologer
Bobby Cross (1931–1989), American football player
Robert Crosse (1606–1683), English theologian
Robert Crosse (MP) (died 1611)

See also
Rob Cross (disambiguation)

Roberts cross, a technique used in image processing and computer vision for edge detection
Robert Cross Smith (1795–1832), British astrologer